John Collier may refer to:

Arts and entertainment
John Collier (caricaturist) (1708–1786), English caricaturist and satirical poet
John Payne Collier (1789–1883), English Shakespearian critic and forger
John Collier (painter) (1850–1934), English artist and author
John Collier (fiction writer) (1901–1980), British-born author and screenplay writer
John Collier (sculptor) (born 1948), American sculptor and artist
Basil Collier (John Basil Collier, 1908–1983), British author of books on military history

Public officials
John A. Collier (1787–1873), American lawyer and politician
John J. Collier (1815–1892), Superior Court judge from Atlanta, Georgia
John Collier (MP) (1769–1849), Member of Parliament for Plymouth

Sportspeople
Jock Collier (John C. Collier, 1897–1940), Scottish footballer and manager
John Collier (athlete) (1907–1984), American hurdler

Others
John Howell Collier (1898–1980), U.S. Army general
John W. Collier (1929–1950), U.S. Army soldier and Medal of Honor recipient
John G. Collier (1935–1995), British chemical engineer and administrator
John Collier (sociologist) (1884–1968), American social reformer, sociologist, writer and Native American advocate
John Collier Jr. (1913–1992), American anthropologist, son of the sociologist, and photographer working for the Farm Security Administration or Office of War Information
R. John Collier, American microbiologist and biochemist

Companies
John Collier (clothing retailer), a British chain of men's clothing shops

See also
Jonathan Collier, American television writer
Collier (disambiguation)